Ajax København is a handball club based in southwestern Copenhagen, Denmark, consisting of both a women's and a men's team. As of the 2022-23 season, the women's team compete in Damehåndboldligaen, the highest women's league in Denmark. The men’s team went bankrupt in 2022, and therefore were relegated to the 3rd division. Ajax København play their home matches in Bavnehøj-Hallen.

History
The club was founded as IF Ajax in 1934. In the following decades, the men’s team took home 9 Danish championships – the most recent in 1964.

In 2022 the men’s team went bankrupt and were relegated to the 3rd division.

Women's team

Kits

Current squad
Squad for the 2022–23 season

Goalkeepers 
 1  Sarah Nørkilt Lønborg (c)
 12  Natasja Clausen  
 20  Rakul Wardum
Wingers 
LW
 2  Matilde Kondrup Nielsen
 27  Anna Grundtvig
RW
 11  Lív Sveinbjørnsdóttir Poulsen
 18  Rosa Skovlund Schmidt
Line players
 7  Simone Monsrud Pedersen
 15  Amanda Loft Hansen

Back players
LB
 6  Chantal Wick
 8  Súna Krossteig Hansen
 21  Maja Eiberg Jørgensen 
 29  Amanda Poulsen
 34  Katrine Jacobsen
CB
 4  Olivia Black
 8  Emma Kiellberg
 33  Emma Rose Penny Laursen 
RB
 22  Anne With Johansen
 28  Cecilie Specht

Transfers
Transfers for the season 2023-24

Joining

Leaving
  Amanda Loft Hansen (P) (to  Ikast Håndbold)
  Emma Caroline Petersen (P) (immediately as of december 2022)

Staff

Men's team

Accomplishments Men
Danish Handball League: 9
1937, 1942, 1944, 1948, 1949, 1950, 1952, 1953, 1964
 Double
 Winners (1): 1963–64

References

External links
 Ajax Heroes

Danish handball clubs
Sports clubs in Copenhagen
Vesterbro, Copenhagen